Les Chutes-de-la-Chaudière was a former regional county municipality and census division in Quebec. It and Desjardins Regional County Municipality were formed from the division of Lévis County in the 1980s. It ceased to exist when most of it, along with most of Desjardins RCM, amalgamated into the expanded city of Lévis on January 1, 2002.

Subdivisions
Les Chutes-de-la-Chaudière RCM consisted of:
 Charny
 Saint-Étienne-de-Lauzon
 Saint-Jean-Chrysostome
 Saint-Nicolas
 Saint-Lambert-de-Lauzon
 Saint-Rédempteur
 Saint-Romuald
 Sainte-Hélène-de-Breakeyville

Dissolution
When Les Chutes-de-la-Chaudière RCM was dissolved, nearly all of its components amalgamated into the newly expanded Lévis:

 Saint-Étienne-de-Lauzon, Saint-Nicolas, Saint-Redempteur comprised the borough of Les Chutes-de-la-Chaudière-Ouest.
 Charny, Saint-Jean-Chrysostome, Saint-Romuald, and Sainte-Hélène-de-Breakeyville comprised the borough of Les Chutes-de-la-Chaudière-Est.
 Saint-Lambert-de-Lauzon remained independent and joined La Nouvelle-Beauce Regional County Municipality.

See also
 Municipal history of Quebec

References

Former regional county municipalities in Quebec
Populated places disestablished in 2002
Lévis, Quebec
2002 disestablishments in Quebec